General Davison may refer to:

Donald Angus Davison (1892–1944), U.S. Army major general
Frederic E. Davison (1917–1999), U.S. Army major general
Michael S. Davison (1917–2006), U.S. Army four-star general 
Michael S. Davison Jr. (born 1941), U.S. Army lieutenant general
Peter Weimer Davison (1869–1920), U.S. Army brigadier general